Jamie Delgado and Bruno Soares were the defending champions; however, they chose to not participate this year.
Carlos Berlocq and Leonardo Mayer won in the final 7–6(1), 6–3, against Mariano Hood and Horacio Zeballos.

Seeds

Draw

Draw

External links
 Main Draw

Prime Cup Aberto de Sao Paulo - Doubles
2009 - Doubles
2009 in Brazilian tennis